Intelligent Enterprise (CMP Media, LLC) was the title of a magazine for business and IT executives who develop and manage their companies' strategic enterprise systems. This magazine expanded on earlier intelligent enterprise concepts, focusing on analytical software tools and underlying technologies for organizing both intellectual assets and transactional data. The print edition ended in February 2007 and the title is used now as a website. Doug Henschen is editor in chief and Antone Gonsalves is web editor.

History and profile
Founded at Miller Freeman, Inc., (San Francisco) in 1998, by David M. Kalman, the magazine merged two titles, Database Programming and Design magazine and DBMS magazine. Founding editor/editorial director was David Stodder, who left the magazine in early 2007, with founding editor-in-chief Justin Kestelyn, Senior Editor Jeanette Burriesci, and Design Director Jim Shinnick. In 1999, Miller Freeman merged into CMP Media (Manhasset, New York), a division of United Business Media plc.

Intelligent Enterprise ceased publication in February 2007.

References

External links
 Intelligent Enterprise Magazine website

Business magazines published in the United States
Defunct computer magazines published in the United States
Magazines established in 1998
Magazines disestablished in 2007
Magazines published in San Francisco